Lucheng Subdistrict is a subdistrict and the seat of Qufu, Shandong, People's Republic of China, located at the intersection of the Qing and Yangtze Rivers. , it has 26 residential communities under its administration.

See also
List of township-level divisions of Shandong

References

Township-level divisions of Shandong
Qufu